Dennis Rodman's Big Bang in Pyongyang is a 2015 documentary film produced and directed by Colin Offland, written by Matthew Baker, and narrated by Matt Cooper. The film follows retired professional basketball player Dennis Rodman on his mission to host a basketball game between former NBA stars and the North Korean team in Pyongyang.

Release 
The film premiered at the Slamdance Film Festival on 25 January 2015. It was also screened at the Manchester Film Festival in March 2016. The film had its television premiere on 26 June 2015 on Showtime.

References

External links
 
 
 Interview with director Colin Offland

Films shot in North Korea
Documentary films about North Korea
Documentary films about basketball
Basketball in North Korea
2010s English-language films